David Thomas McLaggan McMeeking  (30 January 1896 – 30 August 1976) was a New Zealand rugby union player. A hooker, McMeeking represented Otago at a provincial level, and played for the New Zealand national side, the All Blacks, in two matches against the touring New South Wales team in 1923.

During World War I, McMeeking served with the New Zealand Cyclist Corps. He was awarded the Military Medal for bravery in the field as a result of actions on the morning of 1 November 1918 near Saultain in northern France. He died in Dunedin in 1976, and was buried at Andersons Bay Cemetery.

References

1896 births
1976 deaths
Burials at Andersons Bay Cemetery
New Zealand international rugby union players
New Zealand military personnel of World War I
New Zealand recipients of the Military Medal
New Zealand rugby union players
Otago rugby union players
Rugby union hookers
Rugby union players from Alexandra, New Zealand